The AC Brooklands Ace is a roadster built by the British automotive company AC Cars. Launched in 1993 following two previous concept cars of 1986 and 1991, the Brooklands Ace underwent small scale production until 1997 when it received a facelift and reengineering under AC's new owners and was relaunched. The Brooklands Ace did not prove popular, and production ceased in 2000 after a total production run of approximately 58.

Development
The Brooklands Ace traces its history back to the 1986 concept car called the Ace of Spades that featured a high proportion of Ford parts including the 2.9 V6 engine and four-wheel drive system.

The car underwent significant development before reappearing in 1991 with a new design by IAD, a stainless steel chassis and a Ford 3.0 V6 engine.  The second prototype was a standard two-seater, dropping the 2+2 design of the Ace of Spades.

Brooklands Ace (1993-1996)
In 1993 the production model was launched, with a new specification and went into small scale production for two years before AC Cars folded in 1996. The production model is powered by a 5.0 L V8 engine from Ford and is shared with the AC Cobra, producing . The final version included an electric hood mechanism but the pop-up headlights from the earlier prototype had been abandoned, but the aluminium body was kept. Production ended with 46 of the original versions made between 1993 and 1996, by which time AC Cars had gone into receivership.

AC Ace (1997-2000)

Under new ownership in 1996, the Brooklands Ace underwent a significant redesign and re-engineering, with a relaunch at the 1997 London Motor Show as the Ace V8, dropping the Brooklands name. Sales started in 1998, but despite the changes, production reached only 12 units before ending in 2000.

The external changes included a significant re-design to the bumpers, grille, lights (now rectangular instead of round), and a new bonnet. As well as production of some elements outsourced to South Africa, final assembly was undertaken in Coventry. A change of some manufacturing techniques to reduce cost and weight was also included in the refreshed design.

The 1999 London Motor Show car was originally fitted with the Lotus engine, but as it was never operational a 4.6-litre Cobra engine was later installed. A four-seater version called the AC Aceca, reviving an old AC model name, was also launched with the 4.6 L V8 engine. The supercharged 5.0 could reach  and accelerate to 60 mph in 5.5 seconds.

References

External links
 Brooklands Ace website

Roadsters
Brooklands Ace
Cars introduced in 1993
2000s cars